Salvia aegyptiaca, the Egyptian sage, is a herbaceous plant species of the family Lamiaceae.

Distribution
Salvia aegyptiaca is found in the Cape Verde Islands, Canary Islands, NW and N. Africa, Sudan, Ethiopia, Arabian peninsula, Iran, Afghanistan, Pakistan, India.

Morphology
It is herbaceous, with erect-ascending stems. The leaves are oblong to linear-elliptic, rugulose, serrated. This species has inflorescences of simple racemes, sometimes branched. Bracts are present. The corolla has a blue-violet color.

Pharmacognosy
Salvia aegyptiaca has been studied due to its uses in folk medicine in the Old World to treat diarrhoea, gonorrhoea and haemorrhoids, plus it has been used as demulcent, antispasmodic, cicatrizant, antiseptic and stomachic. Its non-polar extracts have been tested as antimicrobial and these presented inhibitory activity against Bacillus subtilis, Pseudomonas aeruginosa, Candida albicans and Staphylococcus aureus.

6-Methylcryptoacetalide, aegyptinones A and B, 6-methyl-epicryptoacetalide and 6-methylcryptotanshinone have been isolated from this species.

References

aegyptiaca
Flora of Mexico
Herbs
Plants described in 1753
Taxa named by Carl Linnaeus